B-boys may refer to one of the following:

Several contenders for 2020 Democratic Party presidential primaries whose first or last name starts with "B"
Individuals who participate in breakdancing